Tau function may refer to:

 Tau function (integrable systems), in integrable systems
 Ramanujan tau function, giving the Fourier coefficients of the Ramanujan modular form
 Divisor function, an arithmetic function giving the number of divisors of an integer